The Landkreis Freystadt i. Niederschles. was a district of the German state of Prussia from 1816 to 1945. It was part of the Prussian Province of Lower Silesia, before 1919 the Prussian Province of Silesia, within Regierungsbezirk Liegnitz. After 1945, it became part of Poland and is currently in the Lubusz Voivodeship. On 1 January 1945 it included:
1 city, Freystadt in Niederschlesien
74 municipalities,
1 Gutsbezirk (Forests).

Demographics 

The district had a majority German population, with some Polish minorities.

History

Kingdom of Prussia

North-German League, Second and Third Reichs

Municipal constitution

References

External links
https://web.archive.org/web/20160304002556/http://www.geschichte-on-demand.de/freystadt.html

Districts of Prussia
Province of Silesia
Province of Lower Silesia
Lubusz Voivodeship
1816 establishments in Prussia
1945 disestablishments in Germany
1945 disestablishments in Poland
1940s disestablishments in Prussia